Daffy's Southern Exposure is a 1942 Warner Bros. Looney Tunes animated short directed by Norman McCabe. The cartoon was released on May 2, 1942, and stars Daffy Duck.

Plot
Daffy Duck decides not to fly south for the winter, as he wants to "check up on this winter business" (gesturing to a newspaper he is reading, with a scantily-clad "snow queen" pictured.)  All the other ducks tell him "You'll be sorry!", and continue flying south.

Daffy initially marvels at the snow and ice that mark Winter's arrival, but as the conditions become progressively worse, he begins to starve and gets stranded in a snowstorm. He spots a log cabin, which he is overjoyed to find it has food. Little does he know, however, but it is the home of a fox and weasel. The former complains about how all they have to get them through the winter is a stockpile of beans, and that he would rather have steak, baked ham or even roast duck. It is at this point that they see Daffy. The two disguise themselves as kindly old ladies in order to keep him in their home. They want Daffy for dinner, and so fatten him up by having him eat large portions of their stock of beans.

Once Daffy realizes their intentions, he quickly tries to escape, outwitting the weasel but not the fox. Daffy forces the fox to chase him up a tree so he can kick him down, then runs further south, past two signs pointing "SOUTH", and one more which reads "And we do mean SOUTH!"

Daffy ends up in South America.  A samba dancer, who is a pastiche of Carmen Miranda, is seen singing in a nightclub, and Daffy is finally shown hiding in the dancer's fruit hat.  Daffy, also wearing a fruit hat, emerges and says, "Si, si!  I like the 'South' American Way.  And I do mean SOUTH."  Daffy winks at the audience before iris-out.

Production
Daffy's Southern Exposure makes reference to topical humor of the era, including a poster encouraging the purchases of war bonds to finance the U.S. involvement in World War II and a parody of the Brazilian entertainer Carmen Miranda—one of her songs, "South American Way", is also referenced.  The film also marked the first time that Warner Bros. used the tune of the wartime rally song "We Did It Before (And We Can Do It Again)" as background music in a cartoon.

References

External links
 
 Daffy's Southern Exposure (Colorized) on the Internet Archive

1942 films
1942 animated films
1942 short films
1940s American animated films
1940s animated short films
American black-and-white films
Films directed by Norman McCabe
Daffy Duck films
Films scored by Carl Stalling
Looney Tunes shorts